Gimcheon Korea Expressway Corporation Hi-Pass is a South Korean professional women's volleyball team. The team was founded in 1970 and became fully professional in 2005. They are based in Gimcheon and are members of the Korea Volleyball Federation (KOVO). Their home arena is Gimcheon Gymnasium in Gimcheon.

Honours

Domestic
 Korea Volleyball Super League
 Runners-up (2): 2003, 2004

V-League
Champions: 2017−18
Runners-up (4): 2005, 2005−06, 2014−15, 2018−19

KOVO Cup
Winners: 2011
Runners-up (5): 2006, 2008, 2010, 2017, 2022

Continental
 AVC Club Volleyball Championship
 Third place: 2005

Season-by-season records

Players

2021−22 team

External links 
 Official website 

Volleyball clubs established in 1970
1970 establishments in South Korea
Sports teams in North Gyeongsang Province
Women's volleyball teams in South Korea
Sport in Gimcheon